Minervarya chiangmaiensis, commonly known as the Chiang Mai rain-pool frog, is a species of frog in the family Dicroglossidae. The holotype specimen was collected in Ban Monjong, Omkoi District, southern Chiang Mai Province, northern Thailand.

Sources

Chatmongkon SUWANNAPOOM, Zhi-Yong YUAN, Nikolay A. POYARKOV Jr., Fang YAN, et al. A new species of genus Fejervarya (Anura: Dicroglossidae) from northern Thailand[J]. 动物学研究, 0,: 33-. http://www.zoores.ac.cn/CN/abstract/abstract3759.shtml

chiangmaiensis
Amphibians of Thailand
Amphibians described in 2016